Drishyam is a 2015 Indian Hindi-language crime thriller film directed by Nishikant Kamat. It is a remake of the 2013 Malayalam film Drishyam. The film stars Ajay Devgn, Tabu, Shriya Saran, Ishita Dutta and Rishab Chadha. It was released on 31 July 2015 and emerged as a critical and commercial success, earning over  crores worldwide. A sequel titled Drishyam 2 was released in 2022. Later in 2022, the film was released in China, earning $4.05 million pushing its worldwide total over ₹147 crores.

Plot
  
The film starts with a new policeman in the town called Pondolem, a fictitious village in Goa, joining the newly built police station in the town. While walking through the station with a constable, he notices a man, ostensibly named Vijay Salgaonkar, sitting at one far end. The newly joined policeman asks whether he is "Vijay Salgaonkar", to which the constable replies positively. The film then goes into a flashback as "Vijay" closes his eyes.

Vijay Salgaonkar is an orphan who dropped out of school after 4th grade. Now he is a content businessman running a cable TV service in Goa. He is married to Nandini, and they have two daughters, Anju, his adopted daughter, a class twelve student, and Anu, a class six student. His only interest is watching films. He has gained a lot of fame and support in his area for helping people with the help of methods he learns from films.

During a nature camp which Anju attends, a hidden cell phone camera records Anju removing her clothes and showering in the bathroom. The culprit, Sameer "Sam" Deshmukh, is the son of Inspector General of Goa Police, Meera Deshmukh. Sam comes to blackmail Anju for sexual favours one day, turning up at her house the same night, when Nandini shows up too; her daughter informed her. Nandini pleads with Sam to leave their family alone, but Sam refuses to delete the video clip unless his sexual demand is fulfilled. Nandini begs him to leave Anju alone, and Sam says he will do it on one condition: Nandini should have sex with him instead. In an attempt to break the offending cell phone, Anju swings at Sam with a lead pipe, but she strikes him in the head instead, killing him immediately. They bury his body in a compost pit in the backyard, which Anu witnesses. In the morning, when he returns from work, Nandini tells Vijay about the incident and he devises a way to save his family from the police. He removes the broken cell phone and disposes of Sam's car, which is seen by the Sub-Inspector Laxmikant Gaitonde, who has a grudge against Vijay. The next day, Vijay takes his family out on a trip to Panaji, where they visit an Ashram, watch a film, and eat at a restaurant.

Meera, realizing that her son has gone missing, starts an investigation.

After a preliminary investigation, Meera calls Vijay and his family for questioning. Having predicted that the police would come calling eventually, Vijay coaches his family on how to face the interrogations without raising suspicion. When questioned individually, the family sticks to their individual stories and the police cannot find a crack in their alibis. Vijay produces bus tickets, movie tickets, lodging and restaurant bills as proof of the family's visit to Panjim. Meera questions the owners of the establishments they have been to and their statements prove Vijay's alibi. Meera realizes that on the day of the incident, Vijay had taken the tickets and the bill, made acquaintance with the owners and had gone for the trip with his family the next day, thus proving his alibi and making the owners unwittingly tell a lie.

Meera has the Salgaonkar family arrested, and Gaitonde uses brute force to beat the truth out of them though Vijay, Nandini and Anju resist. Meanwhile, Meera finds out about Sam and his video of Anju from Sam's friend, Alex. Eventually, Anu gives in and reveals that she has seen a body being buried in the compost pit. After digging into the compost pit, the authorities find the carcass of a dog. Vijay reports to the media that Gaitonde physically abused both his daughters, causing an angry Gaitonde to attempt an attack on Vijay. Still, Vijay's in-laws retaliate, and a mob rises to beat up Gaitonde. Following the incident, Gaitonde is suspended, Meera resigns from her post, and the entire investigating team of the Police Station is transferred out, with the case now requiring authorization from the court. When Nandini asks Vijay about what he did to the body, he refuses to tell her, saying that the secret will remain within his mind and it must go with him without a trace.

Meera and her husband Mahesh meet Vijay at the seaside to ask forgiveness for the video clip and their son's rude and perverted behaviour, and to get a confirmation whether their son is alive or not. They also reveal they would leave for London to live with Meera's brother. Finally, Vijay cryptically confesses to killing Sam. He also asks for forgiveness and explains to them that he would go to any lengths to protect his family.

The film returns to the present day as Vijay opens his eyes. He signs the register in the newly constructed police station. While signing, the new inspector tells him that he can't be fooled and will definitely find out, at which point Vijay smilingly confides that he is sure the local police force and the police station will protect its townspeople.

A flashback plays along as Vijay exits the police station in the present day, revealing that Vijay buried the body under the new police station while it was under construction. As he looks at both sides of the road, the film suddenly closes with a blackout.

Cast

Production

Casting 
In October 2014, it was announced that Saif Ali Khan would take the lead role and reprise the role played by Mohanlal in the 2013 Malayalam predecessor. There were also reports that Akshay Kumar will take up the lead, but in November 2014, it was announced that Ajay Devgn would star in the Hindi remake of the 2013 film Drishyam, which will be produced by Viacom 18 Motion Pictures in association with Panorama Studios and directed by Nishikant Kamat.  Plans then were to have Devgn reprise the role played by Mohanlal in the 2013 film. Later it was announced that Tabu will be playing the role of Meera Deshmukh a cop and Shriya Saran will play the wife of Ajay Devgn's character.

Filming 
Principal photography for the film was slated to begin in February 2015. Ajit Andhare, the chief operating officer of Viacom 18 Motion Pictures stated "Drishyam is an iconic film that leaves you spellbound and intrigued long after you have watched it. Its box office record in Malayalam & Telugu speaks for itself." Actor Ajay Devgn had been in Canada to shoot snow scenes for his upcoming film Shivaay, but light snow conditions had him reschedule that film and return to India to instead begin Drishyam. The First 20 Day Shooting schedule of the film began on 13 March 2015 in Goa and ended on 1 April 2015. The second schedule of the film began in 2nd week of April. The first look of the film was unveiled on 29 May 2015.

Legal issues 
On the announcement of the Hindi remake, film producer Ekta Kapoor sent a legal notice to the Malayalam filmmakers. Ekta Kapoor acquired the movie rights of Japanese author Keigo Higashino's book, The Devotion of Suspect X, and her legal team claimed that Drishyam is a film adaptation of the novel, for which they purchased rights. However, the original Drishyam director and screenwriter Jeethu Joseph, denied that his film is an adaptation or copy of the Japanese novel and film. Commentator Nandini Ramnath noted how the denial of even slight inspiration by the Japanese novel is parallel to the inside movie storyline as "Jeethu Joseph's achievement lies in lifting an intelligent concept and localising it so effectively that the links (to the Japanese novel) appear tenuous unless closely investigated. Drishyam is the perfect crime about a perfect crime, and its director's alibi is almost as airtight as the one Ishigami creates for Yasuko and Misato."

Drishyam was declared tax free in Uttar Pradesh.

Soundtrack 
The music for Drishyam is composed by Vishal Bhardwaj with lyrics written by Gulzar. A song titled "Carbon Copy", which was sung by Ash King, was released on 7 July 2015. The music rights for Drishyam are acquired by Zee Music Company.

Release 

Drishyam was released on 31 July 2015 on 2,365 screens in India.

Reception

Critical reception

Meena Iyer of The Times of India gave the film four out of five stars, describing it as "A suspense drama with a nail-biting finish." Iyer criticized the casting choices for some of the Salgaonkar family, but praised Devgn and Tabu's performances, "Ajay, who is the prey here, shines in his role of the protective father ... Tabu [is] outstanding as his predator." The Indian Express, however, gave the remake two and a half out of five stars and found fault with the chemistry between Devgn and Shriya Saran, who plays his character's wife. Indian Express described Devgan's performance as "stilted" and Tabu's performance as "off-and-on", commenting that she sometimes comes off as stiff.

Rohit Vats of Hindustan Times rated the film three and a half out of five stars, describing it as "Stunning, gripping, edge-of-the-seat, shocking, engrossing". Vats praised the film for being successful as a suspense thriller.

Raja Sen of Rediff gave the film a rating of two and a half out of five stars, noting the pace of the film begins "far too snoozily". Sen described Tabu's character as Inspector General Nair as a "badass superstar", but overall felt "the film is clumsily written, with dialogue that sounds wooden. Contrarily, Bollywood Hungama gave the film four out of five stars and didn't notice the same pacing and script problems as Sen. "There is no single moment in the film suffers a lag ... As for the taut screenplay (Upendra Sidhye), it keeps on playing with your mind all the time. You know what happened but even then you are taken for a ride and start believing in it."

Martin D'Souza of Glamsham gave it four out of five stars and stated "Drishyam is a spot-on crime thriller that has some 'heart-in-your-mouth' moments. It's set up in a made-up village called Pondolim in North Goa. What's satisfying about the entire screenplay is that what Vijay is doing on screen is what you will do for your family. Nothing less; after all, family is all that we have!"

Subhash .K. Jha gave it four and a half out of five stars and stated "Nishikant Kamat's Drishyam is an outright winner. It is a remarkably resonant remake and a unique stand-alone experience."

Suchitra Bajpai Chaudhary of Gulf News gave it four and a half out of five stars and stated "There are no loose ends in the plot; every character, every situation is well planned and visualised to perfection. The background score is evocative though a song highlighting the trauma of the characters seemed eminently forgettable."

The Free Press Journal (FPJ Bureau)
Said, "The climax is just awesome and worth watching and waiting for. Performance-wise, Ajay is very good, as is Tabu. Shriya and the daughters have also acted brilliantly and did justice to their characters. The film's direction and screenplay are very good, while the music is okay. I would say, the movie is must watch."

The review aggregator website Rotten Tomatoes reported that 80% of critics had given the film a positive review based on 15 reviews, with an average rating of 6.5/10.

Box office
The movie grossed  in 13 days at the domestic box office. 

In 2022 film was released in China earning 30k USD on day 1 and total $4.05 million in lifetime run making total woworldwide total gross of ₹1.47 billion.

Sequel 
Following the success of the original Malayalam film Drishyam 2, Panorama Studios accquired the remake rights for the film in May 2021.

Drishyam 2 features Ajay Devgn, Tabu, Shriya Saran, Ishita Dutta, Mrunal Jadhav and Rajat Kapoor, who reprise their roles, along with new additions Akshaye Khanna and Saurabh Shukla.

References

External links 
 
 

2010s Hindi-language films
2015 crime thriller films
2015 drama films
2015 films
2015 thriller drama films
Films directed by Nishikant Kamat
Films scored by Vishal Bhardwaj
Films set in Goa
Films shot in Goa
Hindi remakes of Malayalam films
Indian crime thriller films
Indian thriller drama films
Viacom18 Studios films